Kepler-1638 is a G4V-type star located 4,973 light years away in the constellation of Cygnus. At least one exoplanet has been found orbiting the star: Kepler-1638b. This planet is a potentially habitable Super-Earth. As of January 2021, Kepler-1638 is the farthest star with a known potentially habitable exoplanet.

Planetary system

Kepler-1638 b is an exoplanet in orbit of its star, Kepler-1638, located in the constellation Cygnus. It has an orbit of  days in its system's habitable zone and orbits 0.745 AU from its star.

References

See also 
 Habitability of red dwarf systems
 List of potentially habitable exoplanets

G-type main-sequence stars
Cygnus (constellation)
Planetary systems with one confirmed planet
1638b
Exoplanets discovered in 2016
Transiting exoplanets
Super-Earths in the habitable zone